This is a list in alphabetical order of cricketers who have played for Chilaw Marians Cricket Club (founded 1975) in first-class matches since the club initially achieved first-class status in 2001. Where an article exists, the link precedes the Chilaw career span and the scorecard name (usually initials and surname) follows it. If there is no article, the scorecard name precedes the span.

A
 Lasith Abeyratne (2010–11) : L. Abeyratne
 A. M. C. D. Abeysinghe (2018–19)
 Vidura Adikari (2012–13 to 2022–23) : A. K. V. Adikari 
 Niksy Ahmed (2014–15) : N. N. Ahmed
 Ali Khan (2012–13) : Ali Khan
 Geeth Alwis (2013–14) : W. G. R. K. Alwis 
 A. Anand (2022)
 Anuj Jotin (2022 to 2022–23)
 Chandana Aravinda (2004–05 to 2006–07) : S. D. C. Aravinda
 N. H. Atharagalla (2018–19 to 2021–22)
 Amal Athulathmudali (2007–08 to 2011–12) : D. N. A. Athulathmudali

B
 M. A. T. S. Bandara (2012–13)
 Scott Borthwick (2014–15) : S. G. Borthwick
 M. L. R. Buddika (2019–20 to 2021–22)

C
 Manoj Chanaka (2003–04 to 2006–07) : P. U. M. Chanaka
 Harsha Cooray (2006–07 to 2018–19) : N. H. G. Cooray
 D. L. S. Croospulle (2019–20 to 2021–22)

D
 Rohit Damodaran (2013–14 to 2017–18) : R. Damodaran
 Dinesh Daminda (2012–13) : T. D. D. Darshanapriya
 W. R. K. S. Darshika (2019–20)
 Gayan de Silva (2014–15) : K. T. G. T. de Silva
 Sanath de Silva (2012–13) : S. H. S. S. de Silva
 Thikshila de Silva (2014–15 to 2022–23) : S. N. T. de Silva
 Chalana de Silva (2014–15 to 2017–18) : W. C. de Silva
 Thushendra De Zoysa (2001–02 to 2002–03) : D. T. de Zoysa
 Ranil Dhammika (2003–04 to 2004–05) : D. G. R. Dhammika
 Sachith Dias (2012–13) : D. S. A. Dias
 M. R. P. U. Dias (2017–18 to 2018–19)
 G. K. Dilhara (2022 to 2022–23)

E
 Shaminda Eranga (2006–07 to 2011–12) : R. M. S. Eranga

F
 A. H. A. Fernando (2022 to 2022–23)
 Asitha Fernando (2016–17 to 2020) : A. M. Fernando
 B. O. P. Fernando (2017–18 to 2020)
 Charith Sylvester (2001 to 2012–13) : C. S. Fernando
 Upul Fernando (2012–13 to 2014–15) : E. F. M. U. Fernando
 F. V. Fernando (2015–16)
 Dinusha Fernando (2012–13) : K. A. D. M. Fernando
 Hasantha Fernando (2002–03 to 2007–08) : K. H. R. K. Fernando
 Sanahasa Fernando (2004–05) : K. N. S. Fernando
 Lakmal Fernando (2001–02) : L. L. Fernando
 Samantha Fernando (2003–04 to 2012–13) : L. S. Fernando
 Akshu Fernando (2015–16) : M. A. P. Fernando
 Rukshan Shehan (2013–14 to 2017–18) : M. A. R. S. Fernando
 Damian Fernando (2002–03) : M. G. D. C. Fernando
 Sanjaya Fernando (2012–13) : M. S. D. Fernando
 N. N. Fernando (2020–21)
 P. S. U. Fernando (2017–18)
 Shasheen Fernando (2014–15 to 2015–16) : P. S. W. Fernando
 W. K. I. Fernando (2017–18 to 2022–23)
 W. R. D. Fernando (2018–19)
 N. A. Francisco (2018–19)

G
 Malintha Gajanayake (2003–04 to 2005–06) : M. K. Gajanayake
 Chaminda Gamage (2014–15 to 2018–19) : C. Gamage
 Lahiru Gamage (2013–14 to 2015–16) : P. L. S. Gamage
 B. H. I. T. Gaminda (2022–23)
 Akalanka Ganegama (2015–16) : W. C. A. Ganegama
 S. C. Ghadigaonkar (2019–20)
 R. V. Gomez (2017–18 to 2018–19)
 S. M. Gugale (2022–23)
 Janaka Gunaratne (2001 to 2011–12) : L. J. P. Gunaratne
 Malith Gunathilake (2008–09 to 2011–12) : D. M. Gunathilake
 Amila Gunawardene (2001 to 2002–03) : A. Gunawardene
 D. M. N. D. Gunawardene (2017–18)
 Kanchana Gunawardene (2013–14 to 2014–15) : K. D. Gunawardene

H
 Thanura Halambage (2015–16) : T. D. Halambage
 H. M. C. U. Herath (2012–13)
 Dinuka Hettiarachchi (2005–06 to 2015–16) : D. Hettiarachchi

I
 Imraz Raffi (2011–12 to 2014–15) : M. R. M. Imraz
 Nuwan Indika (2003–04) : P. K. N. Indika
 Upul Indrasiri (2013–14) : S. A. D. U. Indrasiri

J
 M. R. Jaleel (2013–14)
 Arosh Janoda (2009–10 to 2016–17) : J. G. A. Janoda
 Ansley Jansze (2007–08 to 2012–13) : A. P. Jansze
 G. A. Jathar (2022 to 2022–23)
 W. M. C. Jayampathi (2022)
 H. Jayasekera (2022)
 Angelo Jayasinghe (2012–13) : A. J. A. D. Jayasinghe
 Chinthaka Jayasinghe (2003–04) : C. U. Jayasinghe
 Asela Jayasinghe (2012–13) : K. A. S. Jayasinghe
 H. Jayasundera (2014–15)
 Akila Jayasundera (2012–13) : J. M. A. B. Jayasundera
 Praneth Jayasundera (2001 to 2007–08) : J. M. P. C. Jayasundera
 Shehan Jayasuriya (2016–17 to 2020) :  G. S. N. F. Jayasuriya
 Prabath Jayasuriya (2012–13) : N. G. R. P. Jayasuriya
 D. K. R. C. Jayatissa (2018–19)
 Jayan Jayawardene (2006–07) : J. H. C. Jayawardene
 Saliya Saman (2013–14 to 2015–16) : P. A. S. S. Jeewantha

K
 K. R. M. D. Kaluarachchi (2006–07)
 Ravindra Karunaratne (2009–10) : M. L. R. Karunaratne
 Umesh Karunaratne (2011–12 to 2013–14) : T. M. U. S. Karunaratne
 Navin Kavikara (2012–13) : N. M. Kavikara (List A only)
 Nuwan Kavinda (2012–13) : G. T. H. N. Kavinda
 Charith Keerthisinghe (2006–07) : D. C. B. Keerthisinghe
 Chanaka Komasaru (2014–15) : N. C. Komasaru
 Y. B. Kothari (2019–20)
 L. R. Krishantha (2012–13 to 2020–21)
 Geeth Kumara (2010–11 to 2013–14) : H. G. Kumara
 S. A. C. Kumara (2018–19 to 2020–21)

L
 W. W. W. L. Lakshan (2022–23)
 Tharanga Lakshitha (2003–04) : A. B. T. Lakshitha
 A. K. K. Y. Lanka (2018–19)
 Maduka Liyanapathiranage (2009–10 to 2016–17) : M. A. Liyanapathiranage

M
 Malinga Surappulige (2012–13) : S. D. C. Malinga
 Dinidu Marage (2001–02 to 2002–03) : D. A. Marage
 Nisham Mazahir (2012–13) : M. N. Mazahir
 A. Melayil (2019–20)
 P. H. K. D. Mendis (2019–20 to 2021–22)
 S. T. Mendis (2020–21)
 Ishan Mutaliph (2001–02 to 2005–06) : T. M. I. Mutaliph

N
 K. D. Nandey (2018–19)
 A. Z. Nazar (2021–22)
 Suresh Niroshan (2004–05 to 2011–12) : W. A. S. Niroshan
 Dhammika Niroshana (2003–04) : H. D. Niroshana
 K. Nuwantha (2022 to 2022–23)

P
 Ruchira Palliyaguruge (2001–02 to 2003–04) : R. S. A. Palliyaguruge
 J. S. Pande (2021–22)
 J. Pandey (2021–22)
 Sachith Pathirana (2012–13) :  S. S. Pathirana
 B. H. V. C. Peiris (2021–22 to 2022–23)
 Chinthaka Perera (2002–03 to 2011–12) : G. A. C. R. Perera
 Dammika Perera (2001 to 2005–06) : L. D. I. Perera
 Isuru Perera (2005–06 to 2006–07) : M. A. I. M. Perera
 Dilruwan Perera (2004–05) : M. D. K. Perera
 Nimesh Perera (2003–04 to 2009–10) : M. M. D. N. Perera
 Nimesh Perera (cricketer, born 1982) (2001 to 2018–19) : N. A. N. N. Perera
 R. M. N. T. Perera (2012–13)
 Arosha Perera (2001 to 2005–06) : W. A. D. A. Perera
 Lassana Perera  (2006–07) : W. L. R. Perera
 K. T. G. D. Prasad (2022)
 H. S. M. Prasanna (2022)
 S. N. N. K. Premaratne (2022–23)
 L. H. M. P. Premasinghe (2012–13)
 Nuwan Priyankara (2001) : A. M. N. Priyankara
 Manjula Priyantha (2006–07) : P. M. Priyantha
 Damith Priyadharshana (2012–13) : R. M. D. P. Punchibandara
 R. Punchihewa (2022–23)
 Malinda Pushpakumara (2009–10 to 2017–18) : P. M. Pushpakumara
 Shashrika Pussegolla (2013–14 to 2014–15) : P. G. C. S. Pussegolla

R
 K. A. S. N. Rajaguru (2015–16)
 Bhanuka Rajapaksa (2015–16) : P. B. B. Rajapaksa
 R. A. C. M. Rajapaksa (2014–15 to 2015–16)
 K. C. B. D. Rajapakshe (2017–18)
 K. J. Rakesh (2018–19)
 Gayan Wijekoon (2003–04 to 2011–12) : W. M. G. Ramyakumara
 S. K. C. Randunu (2018–19)
 R. M. N. Ratnayake (2013–14)
 Rizwan Akbar (2012–13)
 Indika Ruwanpura (2001) : T. M. I. Ruwanpura

S
 J. T. Samaratunga (2001–02)
 W. B. H. Samarawickrame (2013–14)
 J. M. C. Sandaru (2022 to 2022–23)
 D. Sanjeewa (2018–19 to 2022–23)
 L. P. M. Sathyapala (2001 to 2002–03)
 W. D. S. J. Senanayake (2007–08)
 D. A. Seneviratne (2017–18 to 2022–23)
 Sachithra Serasinghe (2016–17 to 2017–18) : S. C. Serasinghe 
 M. A. R. Shehan (2012–13)
 K. R. P. Silva (2008–09)
 M. N. V. Silva (2018–19 to 2020)
 S. D. Silva (2020–21 to 2022–23)
 S. H. M. Silva (2007–08 to 2008–09)
 W. A. A. M. Silva (2015–16 to 2017–18)
 K. A. D. J. Siriwardene (2001–02 to 2002–03)
 Milinda Siriwardene (2007–08 to 2011–12) : T. A. M. Siriwardene
 Sohail Ahmed (2012–13)

T
 D. H. A. P. Tharanga (2017–18 to 2022–23)
 H. C. Tharindu (2020–21 to 2022–23)
 P. A. Theekshana (2020–21 to 2022–23)
 S. T. Tittagalla (2001 to 2006–07)

U
 Isuru Udana (2016–17 to 2017–18) : I. Udana
 Mahela Udawatte (2005–06 to 2016–17) : M. L. Udawatte
 S. P. Udeshi (2018–19 to 2019–20)

W
 W. H. T. Wanniarchchi (2012–13)
 Malinda Warnapura (2015–16) : B. S. M. Warnapura
 M. Weerasinghe (2003–04)
 G. R. L. Weerasuriya (2020–21)
 Lahiru Weragala (2009–10 to 2011–12) : L. A. Weragala
 P. P. Wickramasinghe (2001–02 to 2002–03)
 K. G. K. W. Wickremasinghe (2021–22 to 2022)
 K. N. Wijenayake (2022)
 Sahan Wijeratne (2003–04 to 2014–15) : M. S. R. Wijeratne
 W. M. S. N. Wijesekera (2001)
 Sahan Wijesiri (2012–13) : M. S. M. Wijesiri
 Omesh Wijesiriwardene (2002–03 to 2004–05) : O. L. A. Wijesiriwardene

Y
 Raveen Yasas (2016–17 to 2022–23) : U. R. Yasas

References

Chilaw Marians